The following is a list of 1987 Seattle Mariners draft picks. The Mariners took part in the June regular draft, also known as the Rule 4 draft. The Mariners made 55 selections in the 1987 draft, the first being outfielder Ken Griffey Jr. in the first round. In all, the Mariners selected 29 pitchers, 11 outfielders, 4 shortstops, 3 catchers, 3 first baseman, 3 second basemen, and 2 third basemen.

Draft

Key

Table

References
General references

Inline citations

External links
Seattle Mariners official website